Haywards is a small hillside suburb in the Hutt Valley near Wellington, New Zealand. It is notable for its large electrical substation, which is the main switching point for the Wellington region, and the home of the North Island converter station for the HVDC Inter-Island, which links the North and South Island electricity networks together.

History
Haywards railway station was opened on 15 December 1875, along with Belmont railway station. It was closed in 1954 and replaced by Manor Park railway station.

Haywards was listed in the 1881 New Zealand census as being part of both Mungaroa Riding and Epuni Riding, with a combined population of 58.

Transport
State Highway 58 is the primary route from the Hutt Valley to  Pauatahanui and Porirua.  It leaves State Highway 2 at Haywards. This highway was first built during the 1870s. From the 1940s to the 1970s there were proposals for a railway line, the Haywards–Plimmerton Line, via this route.

In June 2010, the results of a road assessment programme indicated that the Haywards Hill road was amongst the worst in the Wellington region, scoring only 2 out a possible 5.
Construction of a new elevated interchange at the intersection of SH2 and SH58 at Haywards began in 2015 including a new carpark and footbridge across SH2 to Manor Park, and was completed in 2017. Further safety improvements to SH58 are under construction and estimated to be complete by 2023. These include building median and road-side safety barriers, roundabouts at dangerous road intersections and widening parts of the road to four lanes.

Electrical substation and HVDC converter plant
The Haywards electrical substation is one of national grid operator Transpower's largest substations and is a key part of New Zealand's national electricity network. The North Island converter station for the HVDC Inter-Island link is co-sited with the main HVAC substation, and converts the ±350 kV direct current electricity transmitted from the South Island converter station at Benmore to 220 kV alternating current for the North Island, and vice versa.

220 kV to 110 kV interconnecting transformers at Haywards supply the regional 110 kV network that serves much of the Wellington Region. Supply transformers at Haywards step down voltage to 33 kV and 11 kV and provide a connection to the Wellington Electricity subtransmission and distribution network serving the central-north Hutt Valley, from Trentham in the north to Taita in the south. 220 kV lines connect Haywards to the Wilton substation to supply central Wellington City, and north to Bunnythorpe near Palmerston North to connect with the rest of the North Island grid.

References

Populated places in the Wellington Region
Suburbs of Lower Hutt
Electric power transmission systems in New Zealand